Indirect presidential elections were held in Panama on October 10, 1972, electing both a new President and Vice President of the Republic. The National Assembly of Community Representatives elected Demetrio B. Lakas president and Arturo Sucre Pereira as Vice-President for a six-year term (1972–1978).

Results

References

Presidential
Presidential elections in Panama
Panama